This is a list of notable universities in Tunisia.

Universities
Carthage University, Carthage
Ez-Zitouna University, Tunis
 Mahmoud el Materi University, Tunis
Manouba University, Manouba
Tunis El Manar University, Tunis
Tunis University, Tunis
Tunisia Private University, Tunis
Université Tunis Carthage
University of Gabès, Gabès
University of Gafsa, Gafsa
University of Jendouba, Jendouba
University of Kairouan, Kairouan
University of Monastir, Monastir
University of Sfax, Sfax
University of Sousse, Sousse

See also
List of colleges and universities by country
List of schools in Tunisia

References

 
Universities
Tunisia
Tunisia